Maduhak (also Romanized as Madūḩak; also known as Madaḩok) is a village in Abtar Rural District, in the Central District of Iranshahr County, Sistan and Baluchestan Province, Iran. At the 2006 census, its population was 319, in 88 families.

References 

Populated places in Iranshahr County